The Zwinger in the Westphalian city of Münster is part of the old city fortifications from the Early Modern Period. In the Nazi era it was both a gaol and a Gestapo place of execution and was heavily damaged by allied air raids. Since its conversion to a memorial the Zwinger has belonged to the Münster City Museum (Stadtmuseum Münster) and is home to the sculpture Das gegenläufige Konzert.

References 
 Rebecca Horn: Der Zwinger in Münster. W. König Verlag, 
 Max Geisberg: Die Bau- und Kunstdenkmäler von Westfalen, Vol. 41: Die Stadt Münster Teil 1: Die Ansichten und Pläne, Grundlage und Entwicklung, die Befestigungen, die Residenzen der Bischöfe. Aschendorff, Münster, 1976, 
 Barbara Rommé (ed.): Der Zwinger : Bollwerk, Kunstwerk, Mahnmal. Aschendorff, Münster, 2007,

External links 

 Panorama (with sound of the metal hammers)
 History and photographs of the Zwinger

Heritage sites in North Rhine-Westphalia
City walls in Germany
Commemoration of Nazi crimes
Culture in Münster